Nossa Senhora de Lourdes ("Our Lady of Lourdes") is a bairro in the District of Sede in the municipality of Santa Maria, in the Brazilian state of Rio Grande do Sul. It is located in central Santa Maria.

Villages 
The bairro contains the following villages: Loteamento Cidade Jardim, Nossa Senhora de Lourdes, Parque Residencial Nossa Senhora da Saúde, Parque Residencial Nossa Senhora de Lourdes, Vila Ana Maria, Vila Belém, Vila Elwanger, Vila Palotina, Vila Rolim.

Gallery of photos

References 

Bairros of Santa Maria, Rio Grande do Sul